Illimani is a mountain in the Khari Khari mountain range of the Bolivian Andes, about 5,030 m (16,503 ft) high. It is situated south-east of Potosí in the Potosí Department, Tomás Frías Province, Potosí Municipality. Illimani lies south-west of the mountain Uma Jalanta, north-east of Challwiri Lake and north of Illimani Lake.

See also 
 Kimsa Waylla

References 

Mountains of Potosí Department